Arthur Middleton Young (November 3, 1905 – May 30, 1995) was an American inventor, helicopter pioneer, cosmologist, philosopher, astrologer, and author. Young was the designer of Bell Helicopter's first helicopter, the Model 30, and inventor of the stabilizer bar used on many of Bell's early helicopter designs. He founded the "Institute for the Study of Consciousness" in Berkeley in 1972. Young advocated process philosophy, an attempt to integrate the realm of human thought and experience with the realm of science so that the concept of universe is not limited to that which can be physically measured.  Young's theory embraces evolution and the concept of the great chain of being.  He has influenced such thinkers as Stanislav Grof and Laban Coblentz.

Biography

Arthur was the son of Eliza Coxe and Philadelphia landscape painter Charles Morris Young. He was interested in developing a comprehensive theory of reality from an early age. He felt that to acquire the intellectual tools needed for such rigorous study, he should first develop an understanding of mathematics and engineering.  With this decision he was following a career path similar to that of philosopher Alfred North Whitehead, who was a mathematician before he developed the first process philosophy.  Thus after graduation from Princeton University in 1927 Young searched for a suitable invention to develop.  In 1928 he returned to his father's farm in Radnor, Pennsylvania, to begin twelve solitary years of efforts to develop the helicopter into a useful device.

Young's private experiments with helicopter design had mostly involved small scale models.  After twelve years on his own using the models, he took his results and models to the Bell Aircraft Company in Buffalo, New York, in 1941, and the company agreed to build full-scale prototypes. While war was looming for the USA in late 1941 he was issued the key rotor stabilizer bar (also known as a flybar) patent, assigned it to Bell and moved to Buffalo to work with them.  In June 1942 he moved his five-person team to Gardenville, New York, a hamlet on the north border of West Seneca, New York, where they could work in relative secrecy.  The first test flight of the prototype Model 30 occurred in July 1943, and on March 8, 1946, the company received Helicopter Type Certificate H-1 for the world's first commercial helicopter, the Bell Model 47.  This was the "whirlybird" featured in the M*A*S*H movie and television series and was so successful that it continued to be manufactured through 1974. A design as well as a utilitarian success, it was added to the permanent collection of the Museum of Modern Art of New York City in 1984.

Young had become profoundly disturbed by the development of nuclear weapons at the end of the Second World War and decided that humanity needed a new philosophical paradigm.

In August 1946 Young recorded in his notes the idea of the psychopter – the helicopter as the "winged self", a metaphor for the human spirit.  By October 1947 Young felt his work at Bell was complete, and he turned to the next phase of his career as a philosopher of mind (or soul). In 1949, the Franklin Institute awarded him the Edward Longstreth Medal.  In 1952, Young and his wife Ruth organized the Foundation for the Study of Consciousness in Philadelphia, the forerunner of the Institute for the Study of Consciousness.

Also in 1952, Young and Ruth participated in seances conducted by Andrija Puharich's Roundtable Foundation.

Marriages

Young married Priscilla Page in 1933. He was divorced from Priscilla in 1948, and later that year, married artist Ruth Forbes Paine (1903–1998) of the Boston Forbes family, a great-granddaughter of Ralph Waldo Emerson and the mother of Michael Paine. Ruth Forbes was formerly married to George Lyman Paine Jr. Their son Michael Paine married Ruth Hyde Paine, a friend of Lee Harvey Oswald's wife Marina, who was living with her at the time of the JFK assassination.

Death

On 30 May 1995, Arthur Young died of cancer at age 89, at his home in Berkeley, California.

Philosophical views

In 1976, Young's theory of evolution of life on Earth – which attempted to synthesize understandings from geology, biology, anthropology, psychology, and parapsychology – appeared under the title The Reflexive Universe.  Young accepted the general "theory of evolution," but pointed out where he felt the Darwinian theory was insufficient to the facts.  The book also incorporates a brief speculative discussion of further human psychological and spiritual growth.

Published works
 Consciousness and Reality: The Human Pivot Point, Charles Musès and Arthur M. Young (editors), 1972, New York: Outerbridge and Lazard, 
 Geometry of Meaning, 1976, New York: Delacorte Press, reprint ed. 1984, Robert Briggs Associates, 
 The Reflexive Universe: Evolution of Consciousness, 1976, New York: Delacorte Press, corrected ed. with introduction by Huston Smith, 1976, Anodos Foundation, 
 The Bell Notes: A Journey from Physics to Metaphysics, 1979, New York: Delacorte Press, reprint ed. 1979, Doubleday, ; reprint paperback ed. 1984, Robert Briggs Associates, foreword by Peter Dreyer
 Zodiac: An Analysis of Symbolic Degrees by Eric Schroeder, (editor A.M. Young), 1982, Robert Briggs Associates, 
 Mathematics, Physics and Reality : Two Essays, (120p.) 1990, Anodos Foundation, 
 Which Way Out? and Other Essays, (206 p.) 1990, Anodos Foundation, 
 Nested Time: An Astrological Autobiography, (editor Kathy Goss), 2004, Anodos Foundation,

Broadsides
 The Foundations of Science: The Missing Parameter, (26 p.) 1985, Robert Briggs Associates, 
 The Shakespeare/Bacon Controversy, (26 p.)  1987, Robert Briggs Associates, 
 Science and Astrology : The Relationship Between the Measure Formulae and the Zodiac, (48 p.) 1988, Anodos Foundation,

Related essays
 John S. Saloma and Ruth Forbes Young, Theory of Process 1: Prelude - Search for a Paradigm, (38 p.), 
 John S. Saloma, Theory of Process 2: Major Themes in 'The Reflexive Universe''', Robert Briggs Associates, Mill Valley, CA, 1991 (50 p.), 

Patents
  Floating Wing Assembly, filed September 1933, issued June 1937
  Aircraft and Means for Stabilizing the Same, filed August 1939, issued September 1941
  Aircraft, filed August 1939, issued September 1941
  Helicopter Aircraft, filed March 1943, issued February 1945
  Captive helicopter-kite means, filed August 21, 1943, issued October 21, 1947
  Variable Diameter Propeller, filed October 24, 1962, issued April 1964

See also
 Richard Bucke
 Buckminster Fuller
 Gerald Heard
 Aldous Huxley
 Noosphere
 List of American philosophers

References

External links
 Arthur Young homepage
 Young interview transcript from Thinking Allowed'' PBS television series
 Recordings of Arthur M. Young – extensive video and audio archive of Young and the Institute for the Study of Consciousness
 An appreciation by Jeffrey Mishlove

1905 births
1995 deaths
Amateur radio people
20th-century American inventors
Aviation inventors
American consciousness researchers and theorists
American parapsychologists
20th-century American philosophers
Philosophical cosmologists
American expatriates in France